Alex Singleton may refer to:

Alex Singleton (fullback) (born 1989), American football fullback
Alex Singleton (linebacker) (born 1993), American football linebacker